Yu Kee Food Company Limited, or Yu Kee, was one of the food chain supermarkets in Hong Kong. It was established in 1990, initially as small family store. It had, at its peak time, around 70 stores all over Hong Kong. Its sold products include frozen food, fruits, dried food, canned food, vegetables and herbs, and they are sold at relatively lower prices than other supermarkets. However, because of financial difficulties, its business shrank.  On 29 August 2011, it went into liquidation because of inability to settle its trade debt.

References

External links

Yu Kee Food Company Limited (Archived in 2011)

Department stores of Hong Kong
Supermarkets of Hong Kong
Retail companies established in 1990
Retail companies disestablished in 2011
1990 establishments in Hong Kong